The Cambridge Archaeological Journal is a peer-reviewed academic journal for cognitive and symbolic archaeology published by Cambridge University Press on behalf of the McDonald Institute for Archaeological Research. It was established in 1991 and is published triannually. It includes major articles, shorter notes, book reviews, and review articles, especially those related to cognitive archaeology.

From 1990 to 2005 the editor was Chris Scarre (McDonald Institute). The current editor-in-chief is John Robb, (University of Cambridge).

Scope 
The journal's focus is on the role and development of human intellectual abilities. It covers theoretical and descriptive archaeological research, ranging from art and iconography, burial and ritual, representations and symbolism, to the evolution of human cognition. The journal covers all eras and all areas, from the Lower Palaeolithic to Colonialism, and from the Pacific to Central Asia. Of note, figurine studies have been widely discussed in several surveys, but in particular in its 1996 feature "Can We Interpret Figurines?". The journal often publishes on Maya archaeology.

References

External links
 

Archaeology journals
Publications established in 1991
English-language journals
Cambridge University Press academic journals
Triannual journals
Cambridge University academic journals
1991 establishments in the United Kingdom